Žibuoklė Martinaitytė-Rosaschi  (born May 4, 1973) is a Lithuanian composer based in New York City. In 2020 Martinaitytė was awarded a Guggenheim Fellowship and the Lithuanian Government Award for Culture and Arts for her creative achievements. Her work In Search of Lost Beauty.... received two gold medals at the Global Music Awards  for "Best Composer" and "Best Album".

Life
Žibuoklė Martinaitytė studied music from 1979 to 1991 at the Kaunas J. Naujalis Art school. From 1991 to 1997 she studied composition at the Lithuanian Academy of Music and Theatre in Vilnius under Professor Bronius Kutavičius and Julius Juzeliūnas. After graduating in 1997, she attended various summer courses for composers: Darmstädter Ferienkurse, the 6th International Academy for New Composition and Audio Art in Schwaz/Tirol, Austria with Bogusław Schaeffer and Marek Chołoniewski, Fondation Royaumont in France with Brian Ferneyhough, José Evangelista and Jean-Luc Herve, IRCAM/Centre Acanthes in France with Jonathan Harvey and Michael Jarrell and the Stavanger orchestral music course in Norway with Ole Lützow-Holm.

When Vilnius became the European Capital of Culture in 2009, Lithuanian National Radio and Television commissioned A Thousand Doors To The World for performance by a symphony orchestra.

In 2022 Martinaitytė was awarded the Lithuanian National Prize for Culture and Arts. In 2020 she received a Guggenheim Fellowship and the Lithuanian Government Award for her creative work.

Ms. Martinaitytė is married to sound designer True Rosaschi.

Grants, fellowships and artists residencies
 2021 - Fellowship for residency at the Blaibach Konzerthaus, Germany.
 2020 - Fellowship for residency at the Bogliasco Foundation, Italy.
 2019, 2011, 2009 - Fellowship for residency at the MacDowell Colony for Artists in New Hampshire.
 2019, 2010 - Grant for residency at the Aaron Copland House in New York State.
 2018 - Grant for residency at the Willapa Bay, Washington State.
 2017 - Grant for residency at Djerassi Artists Residency, California.
 2016 - Fellowship for the New Works residency at the Harvestworks, New York.
 2015 - Grant for residency at the Cité internationale des arts in Paris, France.
 2015 - Grant for residency at the Blue Mountain Center, New York State.
 2014 - Grant for residency at the Wildacres Residency Program in North Carolina.
 2012 - Grant for residency at the Millay Colony for the Arts in New York State.
 2011 - Composer Fellowship for the Other Minds festival (San Francisco, California).

Selected works

Orchestral
 A Thousand Doors To The World (2009)
 Horizons (2013)
 Millefleur (2018)
 Saudade (2019)

Chamber orchestra or large ensemble
 Completely Embraced By The Beauty Of Emptiness (2006) for 13 instruments
 Sort Sol (2019) for string orchestra

Soloist and orchestra
 Chiaroscuro Trilogy (2017) for piano and string orchestra
 Sielunmaisema (2019) for cello and string orchestra

Small ensemble
 Attention! High Tension! (2001) for tuba and piano
 Driving Force (2004) for trombone, tenor saxophone and accordion
 Inhabited Silences (2010) for piano trio
 In Search Of Lost Beauty...(2016) for violin, cello, piano, electronics and video

Solo instrument
 Impulses (2007-2008) for piano
 Forgotten Melodies (2007) for bassoon
 Heights and Depths of Love (2007-2008) for piano
 Serenity Diptychs (2015) for violin, electronics and video
 Aires De Ugnis (2015) for guitar

Vocal
 The Blue of Distance (2010) for a cappella choir
 Chant des Voyelles (2018) for a cappella choir

Discography

Solo CDs
 Horizons (Music Information Centre Lithuania, 2017)
 In Search of Lost Beauty... (Starkland, 2019)
 Saudade (Ondine, 2021)
 Ex Tenebris Lux (Ondine, 2022)

Group CDs
 Zoom in 6: new music from Lithuania (Music Information Centre Lithuania, 2007)
 Zoom in 10: new music from Lithuania (Music Information Centre Lithuania, 2014) 
 Anthology of Lithuanian Art Music in the 21st Century (Music Information Centre Lithuania, 2017)
 Zoom in 12: New Art Music from Lithuania (Music Information Centre Lithuania, 2018)
 Zoom in 13: New Art Music from Lithuania (Music Information Centre Lithuania, 2019)
 The Color of There Seen From Here (Innova Recordings, 2019)

References

Lithuanian composers
Women composers
Recipients of the Lithuanian National Prize
Lithuanian Academy of Music and Theatre alumni
1973 births
Living people